Carcinonemertes is a genus of nemerteans belonging to the family Carcinonemertidae.

The genus has almost cosmopolitan distribution.

Species

Species:

Carcinonemertes australiensis 
Carcinonemertes caissarum 
Carcinonemertes errans

References

Monostilifera
Nemertea genera